Callotroxis is a genus of bristle flies in the family Tachinidae.

References

Dexiinae
Taxa named by John Merton Aldrich
Diptera of South America
Tachinidae genera